Ogdoad may refer to:
Ogdoad (Egyptian)
Ogdoad (Gnosticism)

See also
Ogdoades, a work of history by Guillaume du Bellay
Tonality diamond